The Neuer Marstall is a listed historic building in Berlin, Germany located on the Schloßplatz and the Spree River. Completed in 1901 and facing the former Royal Palace, the neo-Baroque "New Stables" once sheltered the Royal equerry, horses and carriages of Imperial Germany. The complex also included three enclosed courtyards, a riding school, and the Knights College.

At the end of World War I, this was where revolutionaries hatched plans that brought down the Hohenzollern dynasty during the German Revolution of 1918–1919. Severely damaged in World War II, the building was partially repaired in the 1960s and used as an exhibition space for the Berlin Academy of Arts. After more renovations in 2005, the building became the home of the Hanns Eisler Academy of Music and the Berlin City Library. More restoration work has continued since 2007. Lonely Planet lists the Neuer Marstall at  number 79 in their 815 "things to do" in Berlin.

History

The Old Royal Stables of the Prussian Kings were constructed  in 1670 to a design by Johann Gregor Memhardt. As the role of equerry grew and the stables reached 300 horses, as well as state carriages and sleighs, the buildings became inadequate. These were incorporated into the expanded New Stables built between 1897 and 1901 according to Neo-Baroque designs by Wilhelmine architect Ernst von Ihne. The four-storey building was given a sandstone façade: the lower two floors on a rusticated base and the upper two floors in a colossal ionic order. The main façade facing the Berlin City Palace was divided by a central projection with pairs of columns and a crowning pediment. Rich sculptural decoration and the gable reliefs were by Otto Lessing (sculptor), including the "Horse Tamers" group on the Spree pediment.

During the November Revolution of 1918 the People's Navy Division was stationed in the building, leading to the Christmas Crisis. On the establishment of the Weimar Republic the Neuer Marstell became the Berlin City Library and the old horse stables in the Spree wing were converted into a book depository.

After World War II the complex was mainly a ruin. It was partly repaired by the East Berlin government from 1950–54 and then further restored in 1961–65. The triangular gable and sculptural details on the Palace facade were replaced with an attic, resulting in a simplified appearance. The elaborate gable on the Spree side with the Horse Tamers sculpture group remained. During this period the building served as an exhibition space for the Akademie der Künste der DDR. In 1988, two bronze reliefs were installed in the large corner niches on the Palace Square facade on the 70th anniversary of the November Revolution.

Current use

After German reunification in 1990 and renovations in 2005, the building became home to the Hanns Eisler Academy of Music, one of Europe's most prestigious conservatories. More renovation work saw a cleaned and restored facade facing Palace Square. The Berlin Senate Department for Urban Development estimates that the Neuer Marstell will again achieve reasonable architectural appearance in relation to Palace Square after completion of more restoration and the reconstruction of the Berlin City Palace.

Gallery

References

External links

Hochschule für Musik Hanns Eisler Official Website 

Stables
Buildings and structures in Berlin
Baroque Revival architecture
Infrastructure completed in 1901
1901 establishments in Germany
Prussian cultural sites